Omotayo Akinremi (born 13 September 1974) is a Nigerian former sprinter and hurdler. She competed in local and international competitions in athletics representing Nigeria. She won gold medals at the 1992 and 1993 African Championships in Athletics at 400 metres hurdles, she also won bronze medal at the 1990 event, and during the 1991 All-Africa Games she won bronze medals in the 400m hurdles. Emily also won the 200 metres at the 2000 Oceania Athletics Championships. Furthermore, she participated in the Nigerian 4 × 400 m relay team that won bronze medals at the 1993 Summer Universiade with Olabisi Afolabi, Omolade Akinremi and Onyinye Chikezie.

Achievements

World Junior Championships in Athletics

African Championships in Athletics

African Games

Summer Universiade

Personal bests
400 metres hurdles – 57.59 s (1992)
400 metres – 52.53 s (1993)

See also
Omolade Akinremi

References

1974 births
Living people
Nigerian female hurdlers
Nigerian female sprinters
African Games bronze medalists for Nigeria
African Games medalists in athletics (track and field)
Universiade medalists in athletics (track and field)
Athletes (track and field) at the 1991 All-Africa Games
Universiade bronze medalists for Nigeria
Medalists at the 1993 Summer Universiade
20th-century Nigerian women